Among Wolves (or Les Loups entre eux) is a French drama, crime film directed by José Giovanni.

Plot
A group of terrorists kidnap a US general of NATO. The viewer follows the recruitment of a commando of mercenaries (by the Secret Service) to deliver the training of the latter and the conduct of the mission.

Cast

 Claude Brasseur : Lacier
 Jean-Hugues Anglade : Richard Avakian
 Robert Arden : General Lee W. Simon
 Niels Arestrup : Mike
 Gérard Darmon : The Cavale
 Bernard-Pierre Donnadieu : De Saintes
 Daniel Duval : The Gitan
 Paul Giovanni : Paul
 Lisa Kreuzer : Carla
 Jean-Roger Milo : Bastien
 Gabriel Briand : Spartacus
 Manuel Cauchi : The Italian
  : Jennifer
 
 Bernard Giraudeau

References

External links

1985 films
1980s action drama films
1980s crime action films
1985 crime drama films
1980s spy films
French crime action films
French action drama films
French crime drama films
French spy films
Films about terrorism in Europe
Films directed by José Giovanni
Cold War films
Films about mercenaries
Films with screenplays by José Giovanni
1980s French-language films
1980s French films